The 2004 Cork Premier Intermediate Hurling Championship was the inaugural staging of the Cork Premier Intermediate Hurling Championship since its establishment by the Cork County Board. The draw for the opening round fixtures took place on 10 February 2004. The championship began on 30 April 2004 and ended on 31 October 2004.

On 31 October 2004, St. Catherine's won the championship following a 1-11 to 1-8 defeat of Courcey Rovers in the final. This remains their only championship title in the grade.

Mallow's Pa Dineen was the championship's top scorer with 3-25.

Results

Round 1

Round 2

Round 3

Quarter-finals

Semi-finals

Final

Championship statistics

Scoring events

Widest winning margin: 7 points
Tracton 2-14 - 2-07 Aghada (Round 1)
Courcey Rovers 3-10 - 1-09 Bishopstown (Round 3)
Most goals in a match: 5
Courcey Rovers 3-08 - 2-09 Mallow (Round 1)
Most points in a match: 27
Mallow 1-12 - 0-15 Ballyhea (Round 2)
St. Catherine's 1-15 - 0-12 Blarney (Semi-final)
Most goals by one team in a match: 3
Courcey Rovers 3-08 - 2-09 Mallow (Round 1)
Aghabullogue 3-06 - 1-17 Aghada (Round 2)
Courcey Rovers 3-10 - 1-09 Bishopstown (Round 3)
Most goals scored by a losing team: 3
Aghabullogue 3-06 - 1-17 Aghada (Round 2)
Most points scored by a losing team: 12 
Aghabullogue 0-12 - 1-10 Ballinhassig (Round 1)
Ballyhea 1-12 - 2-11 Mallow (Round 2)
Inniscarra 1-12 - 2-11 Carrigtwohill (Round 3)
Blarney 0-12 - 1-15 St. Catherine's (Semi-final)

Top scorers

Top scorer overall

Top scorers in a single game

Miscellaneous

 On 30 April 2004, Carrigtwohill's Craig Horgan became the first ever Cork Premier Intermediate Hurling Championship goal-scorer.
 St Catherine's are crowned the first Premier Intermediate Hurling Champions.

References

Cork Premier Intermediate Hurling Championship
Cork Premier Intermediate Hurling Championship